Muhammad Mamle (1925 – 23 January 1999) was a Kurdish musician and singer. He renewed hundreds of Kurdish folkloric songs.

He died on 23 January 1999 at the age of 74 in the Kurdish city of Mahabad, and was buried there in the Budak Sultan graves. His son Abdullah Mamle is also a professional singer.

He made some of the poets poetries songs, especially “Hemn Mukryani’s” poems. 
One of his famous song is “Blweri Shwan”.

References

1925 births
1999 deaths
Democratic Party of Iranian Kurdistan politicians
People from Mahabad
20th-century Iranian male singers
Iranian Kurdish people
Kurdish-language singers